John Hughes is a town in Saint Mary Parish, Antigua and Barbuda.

Demographics 
John Hughes has two enumeration districts.

 82500 JohnHughes-B_Neck 
 82600 JohnHughes-Bishops

Census Data

References 

Saint Mary Parish, Antigua and Barbuda
Populated places in Antigua and Barbuda